Individuals and events related to Uzbekistan in 2021.

Incumbents

Establishments

Disestablishments

Events

Ongoing
 COVID-19 pandemic in Uzbekistan

August
 8 August - Ruling Uzbekistan Liberal Democratic Party nominates incumbent Uzbek President Shavkat Mirziyoyev as presidential candidate for the country's presidential election in October.

December
7 December - An explosion in a two-storey shopping mall in Denau district of Uzbekistans Surkhandarya region has killed two people and injured nine others. Two victims were found under the rubble of the ruined building after the firefighters extinguished the fire. A preliminary investigation is underway, the Uzbek Emergency Ministry said.

Deaths 
3 February - Alijan Ibragimov, 67, mining executive
12 March - Stahan Rakhimov, 83, singer
21 March - Xudoyberdi To'xtaboyev, 88, children's author
31 March - Tamara Chikunova, 72, human rights activist
3 May - Surat Ikramov, 76, human rights activist
15 August - Usmankhan Alimov, 71, Islamic cleric
13 October - Viktor Bryukhanov, 85, engineer
21 November - Bakhtiyor Ikhtiyarov, 81 actor
17 December - Sa'dulla Begaliyev, 66/67 politician
28 December - Nikolay Shirshov, 47, footballer

See also
 Outline of Uzbekistan
 List of Uzbekistan-related topics
 History of Uzbekistan

References

Notes

Citations

Further reading
 
 

 
2020s in Uzbekistan
Years of the 21st century in Uzbekistan
Uzbekistan
Uzbekistan